The Ray E. Taylor House, also known as The Castle, is a historic house in Whitefish, Montana, U.S., overlooking the Whitefish River. It was built for Ray E. Taylor from 1929 to 1931. It was designed in the Tudor Revival architectural style. It has been listed on the National Register of Historic Places since August 10, 1990.

References

Houses on the National Register of Historic Places in Montana
Tudor Revival architecture in Montana
Houses completed in 1931
Houses in Flathead County, Montana
National Register of Historic Places in Flathead County, Montana
Whitefish, Montana
1931 establishments in Montana